Lethargy is a 1983 Soviet drama film directed by Valeriy Lonskoy.

Plot 
The film tells about a young scientist who has everything, but he feels miserable. Suddenly his mother dies, he meets his daughter, who is experiencing her first love and his soul is finally awakening.

Cast 
 Andrey Myagkov as Bekasov
 Natalya Sayko as Olya
 Valentina Panina as Lida
 Rimma Korostelyova as Masha
 Vasiliy Bochkaryov as Mikhail Platonovich
 Sergei Dityatev as Fokin (as S. Dityatev)
 Igor Vladimirov as Obolensky (as I. Vladimirov)
 Viktor Filippov as Dadashev (as V. Filippov)
 Anna Varpakhovskaya as Zhenya (as A. Varpakhovskaya)
 Sergey Nikonenko as Golovin (as S. Nikonenko)

References

External links 
 

1983 films
1980s Russian-language films
Soviet drama films
1983 drama films